Diamond Peak is a peak rising to 610 m west of Jason Harbor, Cumberland West Bay, on the north coast of South Georgia. Charted and named by DI between 1925 and 1929.

Mountains of Antarctica